The Prodigies (also known as The Night of The Prodigies in the Amazon Studios version) is a 2011 French-British computer-animated science fiction, action, horror and psychological thriller film based on La Nuit des enfants rois, a novel written by French writer Bernard Lenteric.

Released theatrically on 8 June 2011, the film received generally negative reviews from critics with most critics and audiences making comparisons between The Prodigies and two other films Village of the Damned and Law Abiding Citizen and was a box office bomb, grossing only $1 million against a budget of $31 million.

Plot

Ten-year-old Jimbo Farrar is a gifted child who is misunderstood and regularly beaten by his parents. One day, he is badly beaten by his father while his mother cheers him on, and Jimbo gets carried away by his anger and loses control of his abilities. When he wakes, he finds his mother's body on the floor, as she had been beaten to death by his father, who then hanged himself, all under the mental control of Jimbo. He is then sent away to a mental hospital, where Jimbo is visited by multi-billionaire Charles Killian, who decides to take him under his wing to help him control his abilities. Twenty years later, Jimbo has become a brilliant researcher in the Killian Foundation for Gifted Children, married to Ann with whom they are due to have a child. Jimbo has only one goal: to find young children who, like him, possess supernatural powers. Thus, he created an extremely complex online game "The Game" in the hopes that he'll be able to identify any such people around the United States. One night, five unrelated teenagers pass the game and hack Jimbo's computer. In desperation, Jimbo shuts his computer down and restarts it, only to find a message on his screen with the words: "Where Are You?" Jimbo immediately sets out to find them and bring them to the Foundation, but on his return he learns of the death of Killian. The Foundation therefore passes onto Melanie, Killian's lesbian daughter, who plans with Jenkins - her second-in-command - to end Jimbo's game and instead work on a TV show. In order to save the game - and the possibility of locating more "Prodigies" - Jimbo has the idea of combining the ideas: create a large-scale televised competition to reveal future geniuses. The show, American Genius, is launched, and five teenagers are announced as participants - hand-picked by Jimbo, having met and identified them as "Prodigies": Gil, an abused child who was like Jimbo when he was a child but darker; Liza, a young girl trained to be a top model; Lee, a young Asian immigrant who helps her parents in their trade; Harry, an African-American whose mother wastes all her money in gambling; and Sammy, the only son of a wealthy family and physical ungrateful. The five are identified immediately and Jimbo arranges to meet with them in secret in Central Park. No sooner are the teenagers gathered than two thugs assault and rape Liza. Jimbo, however, is not there: he has just learned that Ann is pregnant. He learns of the teenagers' situation too late and, by the time he arrives at the park, Liza is missing and the other four are on the floor, unconscious. However, through Liza's agony while she is being raped, her pain is telepathically extended to the other four teenagers and Jimbo, who unconsciously drive out the thugs using mind-controlling abilities of their own. As soon as Jimbo recovers his senses, he hurries to Liza and finds her in a coma. The next day he learns that Melanie wants to cover up the crime, in order to preserve the TV show, by claiming Liza was injured by a hit-and-run driver. Furious, Jimbo violently demands an explanation, and his anger almost makes him lose control of his abilities and as a result he is fired from the Killian Foundation. After that, he vows to protect the other four, and locks himself away in his office with his computer, afraid because of how he had almost lost control like in the day of the death of his parents. Meanwhile, under the leadership of Gil, the five teenagers infiltrate the archives of the Killian group, where they find video recordings of Jimbo during his sessions in the mental hospital. Here he talks about his feelings of isolation caused by his supernatural abilities, as well as the possibility of others like him (even Charles Killian) being out there. The mention of him bringing them all together to avenge themselves for all the years of mistreatment entices Gil, Sammy, Lee and Harry to bring justice upon Liza's attackers, which they do by brutally killing them as well as the officer, who helped cover up the crime, and his wife using their powers. When Jimbo learns of this, he is very alarmed. Furthermore, Melanie refuses to recognize the truth if only to let the TV show continue, Meanwhile the teenagers are demanding justice. However, one evening, as he tries to reason with the teenagers (who are now murderers), they turn against him. Doubting his trust, they put him to the test by ordering him to kill Jenkins. but Jimbo says "No!", So the teenagers go on to make Jenkins beat up Jimbo (once again with their abilities) and kill Jenkins, then frame Jimbo for his murder. Although Jimbo initially attempts to explain to the policemen the truth about his and the teenagers' superpowers, but starts hallucinating when Gil and Lee tries to make him kill the Lieutenant who interrogating him, and then we see flashbacks of the four teenagers avenging Liza by killing Lorenzo, McKenzie, his wife and Jenkins and sees flashbacks of him being beating up by his parents until he uses his mental powers to kill them. As young Jimbo watches sadly as his father commits suicide with his own belt, After that, we later learn why Jimbo refuses to use his powers against or kill Jenkins when the four teenagers tell him to do, After killing a sparrow in a mental hospital, Killian tells Jim never use his powers again to kill or touch any living things. After that, the policemen don't believe him, particularly due his supposed history of having schizophrenia. Jimbo eventually relents and is sent to prison, where he is kept under surveillance. In the meantime, Gil, Harry, Lee and Sammy make plans for causing large-scale destruction upon the United States, under the belief that this will exact justice for all the pain they had been subject to in the past. Shortly afterwards, Liza comes out of her coma, and Ann visits her to ask her for help, for she now knows of Jimbo's abilities from the police interview, as well as the teenagers' plans to infiltrate the White House to launch nuclear weapons. However, Ann angers Liza, who loses control of her powers and almost kills Ann's baby. In a desperate attempt to prevent the imminent destruction the other teenagers plan on causing, Ann reluctantly seeks help from Melanie, the organiser of the final of American Genius, which will take place in the White House, include the four teenagers plus another fifth contestant named Justin, and be attended by the President of the United States. When Jimbo learns of Liza harming Ann, he uses his powers to break free from prison and joins Liza to reach the other teenagers, as well as Melanie and Ann, at the White House. On site, when she and Jimbo are attempting to sneak into the White House, they are halted by guards and Liza uses her powers for the two of them to escape. This triggering an alarm and initiates a security procedure where everybody in the Oval Office (including the finalists of American Genius) must get to safety in a security bunker. But once inside and all exits are sealed, the four gifted teenagers manipulate the soldiers and bodyguards into killing each other, and Melanie is shot dead under Gil's will. Gil then begins the attacks by launching a nuke at Killian University, where Jimbo and Killian worked. Ann's life is spared when Sammy raises the possibility that her child, being Jimbo's as well, might also be a "golden child". Jimbo eventually arrives at the bunker with Liza, where he learns that Gil is the one leading the group into attacking the US. A fight ensues where Gil attacks Ann and Jimbo fights to protect her, until the fifth contestant Justin fires a gun at Gil when Jimbo is at the verge of being killed. But Jimbo, anticipating the bullet, pushes Gil away and instead receives the bullet in his heart. While Jimbo lies in Ann's arms, dying, Gil horribly slaps Liza for her refusal to cooperate with him, which brings Harry to his senses and convinces his friends to stop all the madness of attacking and killing masses of people across the United States. And so, while one controls Gil in order to prevent him from stopping them, Harry cancels the nuclear attack, saving Killian University by seconds. Shortly afterwards, Jimbo takes his final breath. Three months later, Killian's company has gone bankrupt. Ann, still pregnant, receives a package containing Jimbo's phone (which he had lost in the fight at the White House), which has a final video message from Jimbo. Ann does not know it was left by Liza, who has disappeared from the radar along with Harry, Sammy, Lee and Gil. Liza, Harry, Sammy and Lee now search for other gifted people like themselves, using Jimbo's game, but Gil now continues with his journey on his own, and it seems that he is plotting dark schemes.

Cast

French
 Mathieu Kassovitz as Jimbo Ferrar, the main protagonist of the movie
 Alexis Tomassian as FOZZY/Young Jimbo
 Claire Guyot as Ann
 Sophie Chen as Lee Mishon
 Thomas Sagols as Gil Yepes, the main antagonist of the movie
  as Liza Everton
  as Melanie Killian
 David Scarpuzza as Sammy Goldberg
  as Harry Sparks
 Féodor Atkine as Charles Killian
 Pierre-François Pistorio as Jenkins
 Cédric Dumond as Lorenzo Carvahal
 Patrick Donnay as The President
 Jerome Keen as Doctor
  as Justin
 Alexandre Cross as Lieutenant Smith
 Benoît Van Dorslaer as Chester

English
 Jeffrey Evan Thomas as Jimbo Ferrar
 Stephanie Sheh as Ann/Lee Mishon
 Ben Schiller as Gil Yepes
 Lauren Ashley Carter as Liza Everton
 Cindy Robinson as Melanie Killian
 Dick Smallberries Jr. as Sammy Goldberg
 Ogie Banks as Harry Sparks
 JB Blanc as Charles Killian / Priest
 Bob Buccholz as Jenkins
 Rene Rosado as Lorenzo Carvahal
 Karen Strassman as Elizabeth Farrar (Jimbo's mom)
 Ben Diskin as Diaz Arnesto
 Michael Sorich as Lieutenant Jack McKenzie
 Chris Marlowe as The President
 Donald Leary as Lieutenant Smith
 Joey Lotsko as Doctor
 Wendee Lee as Liza's mother
 Mari Devon as Mrs. McKenzie
 Jaime Seibert as William Farrar (Jimbo’s father)
 Michole White as Harry's mother
 Jonas Alexander Sansone as Sammy / Fozzy / Young Jimbo

Motion-capture performers
 Jeffrey Evan Thomas as Jimbo Ferrar
 Isabelle Van Waes as Ann
 Sophie Chen as Lee Mishon
 Jacob Rosenbaum as Gil Yepes/Young Jimbo
 Lauren Ashley Carter as Liza Everton
 Moon Dailly as Melanie Killian
 Nilton Martins as Sammy Goldberg
 Dante Bacote as Harry Sparks
 Dominic Gould as Charles Killian 
 Jérôme Cachon as Jenkins
 Alex Martin as Jenkins
 Alain Figlarz as Lorenzo Carvahal
 Patrick Vo as Diaz Arnesto
 Patrice Melennec as Lieutenant Jack McKenzie
 Tom Leick as Doctor/The President
 Diego Mestanza as Justin
 Yves Le Caignec as Lieutenant Smith
 Solange Milhaud as Liza's mother/Mrs. McKenzie
 Arnita Swanson as Harry's mother

Reception

Box office 
The Prodigies grossed a worldwide total of $1.3 million against a budget of $31.6 million, making the film a box office bomb.

In France, the film was released in 282 theaters and grossed $957,287 in its opening weekend, ranking 11th. In its second weekend, the film grossed $322,595 from 279 theaters, falling down to 16th.

Critical reception 
On Rotten Tomatoes, the film holds an approval rating of 20% based on 5 reviews, with an average rating of 3.1/10.

Linda Barnard of Toronto Star wrote that the film was "too violent for youngsters and so poorly written it won't engage an older audience, it seems to be targeted towards youthful nerds nursing overwhelming revenge fantasies." Liz Braun of Jam! Movies wrote, "You wouldn't expose a teenager to this, that's for sure, but the storytelling is so ham-handed that few adults would sit still for it" Dave McGinn of Globe and Mail was critical, writing, "The Prodigies pulls together a lot of familiar tropes from superhero movies without adding anything new or compelling to the genre."

In contrast, Sarah Gopaul of Digital Journal gave the film a positive review, stating, "The Prodigies delivers a noteworthy new approach to the “teens with super powers” genre that is worth the big screen treatment."

References

External links 
 

2011 films
2011 computer-animated films
2011 LGBT-related films
2011 psychological thriller films
2010s British films
2010s Canadian films
2010s French films
2010s French animated films
2010s English-language films
2010s French-language films
2010s German-language films
2010s science fiction horror films
2010s science fiction thriller films
Belgian LGBT-related films
Belgian science fiction films
British action horror films
British animated horror films
British computer-animated films
British horror thriller films
British LGBT-related films
British psychological thriller films
British rape and revenge films
British science fiction horror films
Canadian action horror films
Canadian computer-animated films
Canadian horror thriller films
Canadian LGBT-related films
Canadian psychological thriller films
Canadian science fiction films
English-language French films
English-language Belgian films
English-language Luxembourgian films
English-language Indian films
English-language Polish films
French animated horror films
French action horror films
French computer-animated films
French-language Belgian films
French LGBT-related films
French psychological thriller films
French science fiction thriller films
French vigilante films
Indian action films
Indian computer-animated films
Indian horror thriller films
Indian LGBT-related films
Indian rape and revenge films
Indian science fiction horror films
Luxembourgian animated films
Luxembourgian horror films
Luxembourgian LGBT-related films
Luxembourgian science fiction films
Polish animated films
Polish horror films
Polish LGBT-related films
Polish science fiction thriller films
Lesbian-related films
LGBT-related animated films
LGBT-related horror thriller films
LGBT-related science fiction horror films
LGBT-related science fiction thriller films
Fiction about mind control
Films based on French novels
Films set in bunkers
Films scored by Klaus Badelt
Films scored by Hildur Guðnadóttir
Amazon Studios films
Entertainment One films
Method Animation films
Warner Bros. animated films
The Weinstein Company animated films